Eve is an American television sitcom that was broadcast on United Paramount Network (UPN) from September 15, 2003, to May 11, 2006. A total of 66 episodes of Eve were broadcast over three seasons. Created by Meg DeLoatch, the series follows Miami fashion designer Shelly Williams (Eve) through her relationship with physical therapist J.T. Hunter (Jason George).

DeLoatch described the sitcom as "focus[ing] on one relationship and follow[ing] all of the ups and downs in it" and its purpose as "showing the male and female points of view". Shelly and J.T. often turn to their two close friends for advice about the opposite gender, love, and relationships. Shelly frequently looks for advice from former model Rita Lefleur (Ali Landry) and married friend Janie Egins (Natalie Desselle-Reid), while J.T. finds support in his best friend Donovan Brink (Sean Maguire) and IRS worker Nick Dalaney (Brian Hooks). Even though Shelly and J.T.'s relationship is the recurrent storyline, the series does explore the relationships of its supporting cast; Donovan and Rita date each other, and the extremely picky Nick attempts to find the perfect partner.

Critical response to Eve was mixed; some critics praised its inclusion as part of UPN's line-up of black sitcoms, while others felt Eve lacked charisma and the series was inferior to other sitcoms. Despite negative reviews, Eve received various nominations for her performance, and the series was nominated for the Teen Choice Award for Choice Breakout TV Show during the 2004 Teen Choice Awards. Despite its high ratings among young Hispanic women, the show was canceled as a result of UPN's merger with the WB Television Network (The WB) to form The CW in 2006. Its removal, along with a majority of UPN's other programs, garnered negative attention from media commentators, who argued that it was an example of whitewashing. Eve has not been made available on Blu-ray or DVD, but it was released on the iTunes Store, Amazon Video, and HBO Max.

Series overview

Episodes

Season 1 (2003–04)
The first season introduces the six main characters: Shelly, J.T., Rita, Janie, Nick, and Donovan. Shelly runs the fashion boutique DivaStyle with her friends Janie and Rita. She pursues a relationship with J.T. only to discover he is afraid of commitment and exhibits some chauvinistic behavior. Their relationship is frequently tested by misunderstandings. Nick wants to find his ideal partner, but his attempts are typically thwarted as he is extremely picky about women. Even though his relationship with a woman named Dani appears to be successful, they break up in the spring. Donovan finds himself romantically attracted to Rita, but he resists the temptation because of his fear that it would ruin their friendship.

<onlyinclude>

Season 2 (2004–05)
Shelly and J.T. break up at the beginning of the second season but continue a friends with benefits relationship. After discovering that she is bankrupt, Rita moves in with Janie to save money. She also begins a relationship with Donovan. When Janie becomes annoyed with Rita for staying at her home for a long time, Rita persuades J.T. and Nick to let her stay with them instead. Shelly finds herself attracted to a younger man, and J.T. becomes jealous realizing that he is in love with her. In the season finale, both men propose to Shelly. At the same time, Donovan's application for permanent residency is rejected and the friends prepare for his return to England.

<onlyinclude>

Season 3 (2005–06)
In the third-season premiere, Shelly accepts J.T.'s marriage proposal. Donovan gets a work visa after finding a job selling makeup products for a British company. Shelly and J.T. break up again, resolving to remain just friends. J.T. pursues a career in medicine and enrolls in the Miami State Medical School. However, he finds out that college is more difficult than he initially thought, and struggles with his classes and finances. During the spring, Rita reignites her relationship with Donovan and buys her own apartment. In the series' finale, Beverly finally admits to Yusef, Shelly's father, that she is carrying his child; Shelly questions his ability to be a father again. The series ends in a cliffhanger, with Janie, Rita, and Donovan arrested for illegally selling BOTOX at DivaStyle.

<onlyinclude>

References

Citations

Book sources

 
 
 
 
 

Eve